Kizugawa Maru, or Kitsugawa Maru, is a World War II-era Japanese water tanker sunk in Apra Harbor, Guam. Damaged by a submarine torpedo attack off Guam on April 8, 1944, she was towed into port for repairs. In port, she was further damaged in three separate U.S. air attacks during the Mariana and Palau Islands campaign. Deemed irreparable, Kizugawa Maru was scuttled by shore guns on June 27, 1944. The shipwreck is now a deep recreational diving site.

History 
She was then towed to Apra Harbor for repairs by the destroyer Minazuki . Thirty-seven of her sailors were killed in the attack. In the same attack, Seahorse fatally damaged the munitions transport Aratama Maru, which grounded itself in Talofofo Bay. At the time, Guam was occupied by the Japanese after being captured from the U.S. in 1941. 

During the U.S. Mariana and Palau Islands campaign, Kizugawa Maru was further damaged during an air raid on 11 April, and again on 11 and 27 June. Declared beyond repair after the raid on the 27 June, she was scuttled by shore gunfire. Due to her engine room flooding quickly, she sank straight down and sits upright in northern Apra Harbor. About 80% intact, the wreck has an 8 cm/40 3rd Year Type naval gun on her bow with three or four boxes of ammunition. In 2007, researchers noted a large concrete block had crashed through the bow deck structure, apparently due to an mooring accident.

Dive site 
Kizugawa Maru is a deep recreational diving site, sometimes referred to as the Kitz. She is lauded as an "excellent wreck dive" and a rival to "any that can be found on Truk." Due to the depth, recreational divers use Nitrox or are severely limited on the time available at the gun or deck in order to avoid incurring a decompression obligation. Trained wreck divers considering penetration are further cautioned about plentiful silt, as well as twisted metal around the engine room and holds.

References 
 Commonly referred to in diving-related sources as "Kitsugawa Maru." Presumed to be named after the river.

See also
 
 Underwater diving on Guam

1941 ships
Ships built in Japan
Auxiliary ships of the Imperial Japanese Navy
Maritime incidents in June 1944
Shipwrecks on the National Register of Historic Places
Wreck diving sites
Apra Harbor
Underwater diving sites in Guam